Bill Bailey (born August 1, 1948) is an American businessman and politician. He is a member of the Democratic Party.

From Seymour, Indiana, Bailey graduated from Murray State University where he was a founding member of the Sigma Pi fraternity chapter. After graduation, he was in the real estate and marketing businesses. Bailey was a Democratic member of the Indiana House of Representatives from 1990 to 2000. Bailey is also the former mayor of Seymour, Indiana (1983 to 1990) and had also served on Seymour City Council (1976 to 1980). Bailey is currently the president of the Greater Seymour Chamber of Commerce. Bailey ran for Congress in Indiana's 9th congressional district during the 2014 House of Representative elections against two-term incumbent Todd Young, losing to Young 63–33.

References

External links
Project Vote Smart profile

1948 births
Living people
People from Seymour, Indiana
Murray State University alumni
Businesspeople from Indiana
Indiana city council members
Mayors of places in Indiana
Democratic Party members of the Indiana House of Representatives